The cervical loop is the location on an enamel organ in a developing tooth where the outer enamel epithelium and the inner enamel epithelium join. The cervical loop is a histologic term indicating a specific epithelial structure at the apical side of the tooth germ, consisting of loosely aggregated stellate reticulum in the center surrounded by stratum intermedium. These tissues are enveloped by a basal layer of epithelium known on the outside of the tooth as outer enamel epithelium and on the inside as inner enamel epithelium. During root formation the inner layers of epithelium disappear and only the basal layers are left creating Hertwig's epithelial root sheath (HERS). At this point it is usually referred to as HERS instead of the cervical loop to indicate the structural difference.

Cervical loop as epithelial stem cell niche
It is thought that the central epithelial tissue of the cervical loop, the stellate reticulum, acts as a stem cell reservoir. In continuously growing teeth such as the rodent incisor the original structure of the cervical loop is maintained and no HERS forms. The stem cells provide the epithelial progeny to sustain the continuous growth.

References
Cate, A.R. Ten. Oral Histology: development, structure, and function. 5th ed. 1998. .
Ross, Michael H., Gordon I. Kaye, and Wojciech Pawlina. Histology: a text and atlas. 4th edition. 2003. .
Harada, H., Kettunen, P., Jung, H. S., Mustonen, T., Wang, Y. A., and Thesleff, I. (1999) Localization of putative stem cells in dental epithelium and their association with Notch and FGF signaling. J. Cell Biol. 147: 105-120

Tooth development